This article contains a complete list of Michelin starred restaurants in Singapore. The 2016 edition was the first edition of the Michelin Guide to Singapore to be published. Singapore is the only country in Southeast Asia where there are Michelin starred restaurants and stalls, and is one of the four states in general in Asia along with Japan and the special administrative regions (SAR) of Hong Kong and Macau.

In the 2016 edition, two hawker stalls, Hill Street Tai Hwa Pork Noodle and Hong Kong Soya Sauce Chicken Rice and Noodle, became the first Asian street stalls to be awarded Michelin stars. Hong Kong Soya Sauce Chicken Rice & Noodle's most notable dish and also the country's national dish, chicken rice, also became the cheapest Michelin-star meal in the world at S$2 (US$1.60) a serving.

In September 2019, Odette and Les Amis were awarded the three stars award. In September 2021, Zen was awarded the three stars award, resulting in Singapore having three Michelin three-starred restaurants for the first time since the award's inception.

Alphabetic list

List of Michelin Bib Gourmand restaurants and hawker stalls in Singapore
 A Noodle Story, Amoy Street Food Centre
 Ah Er Soup, ABC Brickworks Food Centre
 Alliance Seafood, Newton Circus Food Centre
 Anglo Indian Cafe & Bar, Shenton Way
 Balestier Road Hoover Rojak, Whampoa Makan Place
 Bar-Roque Grill
 Beach Road Fish Head Bee Hoon, Whampoa Makan Place
 Bedok Chwee Kueh, Bedok Interchange Hawker Centre
 Bismillah Biryani
 Chai Chuan Tou Yang Rou Tang, Bukit Merah View Food Centre
 Chef Kang's Noodle House, Jackson Square
 Chen's Mapo Tofu, Shenton Way
 Chey Sua Carrot Cake, Toa Payoh Lorong 1
 Chuan Kee Boneless Braised Duck, Ghim Moh Market & Food Centre; Chong Pang Food Centre
 Da Shi Jia Big Prawn Mee, Killiney
 Depot Road Zhen Shan Mei Claypot Laksa, Alexandra Village Food Centre
 Eminent Frog Porridge & Seafood, Geylang Road
 Famous Sungei Road Trishaw Laksa, Hong Lim Market & Food Centre
 Fei Fei Roasted Noodle, Yuhua Village Market and Food Centre
 Fresh Taste Big Prawn Noodle, Zion Riverside Food Centre
 Fu Ming Cooked Food, Redhill Food Centre
 Guan Kee Fried Kway Teow, Ghim Moh Market & Food Centre
 Hainan Zi, Chong Pang Market and Food Centre
 Hawker Chan Soya Sauce Chicken Rice & Noodle, 335 Smith Street
 Heng, Newton Circus Food Centre
 Heng Heng Cooked Food, Yuhua Village Market and Food Centre
 Hjh Maimunah, Jalan Pisang
 Hill Street Tai Hwa Pork Noodle, Tai Hwa Eating House
 Hock Hai Curry Chicken Bee Hoon Noodle, Bedok Interchange Hawker Centre
 Hong Heng Fried Sotong Prawn Mee, Tiong Bahru Market
 Hong Kee Beef Noodles, Amoy Street Food Centre
 Hong Kong Yummy Soup, Alexandra Village Food Centre
 Hoo Kee Rice Dumpling, Amoy Street Food Centre
 Indocafe, The White House
 J2 Famous Crispy Curry Puff, Maxwell Food Centre
 Jian Bo Tiong Bahru Shui Kueh, Jurong West 505 Market & Food Centre
 Joo Siah Bak Koot Teh, Kai Xiang Food Centre
 Jun Yuan House Of Fish, Old Airport Road Food Centre
 Ka Soh, Outram Park
 Koh Brother Pig's Organ Soup, Tiong Bahru Market
 Kotuwa, Jalan Besar
 Kwang Kee Teochew Fish Porridge, Newton Food Centre
 Lagnaa
 Lao Fu Zi Fried Keow Teow, Old Airport Road Food Centre
 Lai Heng Handmade Teochew Kueh, Yuhua Village Market and Food Centre
 Lian He Ben Ji Claypot Rice, Chinatown Food Complex
 Man Man Unagi, Tanjong Pagar
 Muthu's Curry, Little India
 Na Na Homemade Curry, Bukit Merah View Food Centre
 New Lucky Claypot Rice, Holland Drive Market & Food Centre
 Outram Park Fried Kway Teow Mee, Hong Lim Market & Food Centre
 Shi Hui Yuan, Mei Ling Market & Food Centre
 Sik Bao Sin, Desmond's Creation
 Sin Huat Eating House
 Sin Kee Famous Cantonese Chicken Rice, Holland Drive 
 Soh Kee Cooked Food, Jurong West 505 Market & Food Centre
 Song Fa Bak Kut Teh, New Bridge Road
 Tai Wah Pork Noodle, Hong Lim Market & Food Centre
 The Blue Ginger
 The Coconut Club, Ann Siang Hill
 Tian Tian Hainanese Chicken Rice, Maxwell Food Centre
 Tiong Bahru Hainanese Boneless Chicken Rice, Tiong Bahru Market
 Tiong Bahru Yi Sheng Fried Hokkien Prawn Mee, ABC Brickworks Food Centre
 To-Ricos Guo Shi, Old Airport Road Food Centre
 True Blue Cuisine
 Whole Earth
 Yhingthai Palace
 Zaffron Kitchen, East Coast
 Zai Shun Curry Fish Head, Jurong East Street 24

List of former Michelin Bib Gourmand restaurants and hawker stalls in Singapore
 328 Katong Laksa
 Alaturka, Bussorah Street
 Alexandra Village Claypot Laksa, Alexandra Village Food Centre
 Hoo Kee Bak Chang
 JB Ah Meng Restaurant
 Kok Sen Restaurant, Keong Saik Road
 Liang Zhao Ji Duck Rice, Whampoa Makan Place
 Liao Fan Hawker Chan
 New Ubin Seafood
 Peony Jade
 Rolina Traditional Hainanese Curry Puff
 Shi Wei Da
 Shirokane Tori-Tama
 Shish Mahal
 The Fishball Story, Golden Mile Food Centre
 Tsuta
 Wedang, Golden Mile Food Centre

See also
 List of restaurants in Singapore
 List of Michelin 3-star restaurants

References

Lists of restaurants

Restaurants, Michelin